Navobod may refer to one of several different locations in Tajikistan:

Navobod, Hisor, a jamoat in the city of Hisor, Districts of Republican Subordination Region
Navobod, Istaravshan, a village in the city of Istaravshan, Sughd Region
Navobod, Panjakent, a village in the city of Panjakent, Sughd Region
Navobod, Qubodiyon District, a jamoat in Qubodiyon District, Khatlon Region
Navobod, Rasht District, a jamoat in Districts of Republican Subordination Region
Navobod, Jaloliddin Balkhi District, a jamoat in Jaloliddin Balkhi District, Khatlon Region
Navobod, Tursunzoda, a jamoat in the city of Tursunzoda, Districts of Republican Subordination Region